The Obere Argen ("Upper Argen") is a river in southwestern Bavaria and southeastern Baden-Württemberg in Germany.

Northwest of Oberstaufen in the Bavarian-Swabian county of Oberallgäu, the Seelesgraben, the Moosmühlbach and the Schwarzenbach streams converge forming the Obere Argen. Near Gestratz the Obere Argen collects the waters of the Röthenbach coming from the left and forms the Bavarian-Württemberg state border as far as Wangen.

North of the Wangen district of Neuravensburg the Obere Argen unites with the Untere Argen ("Lower Argen") to form the Argen, which then discharges into Lake Constance between Kressbronn and Langenargen after about 23 kilometres.

Bridges

Argentobel Bridge 

Argen Bridge, Föhlschmitten 
In the Wangen village of Neuravensburg above the road bridge (K 8002), a covered wooden bridge built in 1790 by Abbot Beda Angehrn runs over the Upper Argen.

Obere Argen Viaduct 
The autobahn viaduct comprises a cable-stayed bridge in combination with cable-tensioning beneath the roadway - a form of construction that was a first in Germany.

See also
List of rivers of Bavaria
List of rivers of Baden-Württemberg

References

Literature

External links 
 Bilder rund um die Argen

Rivers of Baden-Württemberg
Rivers of Bavaria
Rivers of Germany